Lépaud is a commune in the Creuse department in the Nouvelle-Aquitaine region in central France.

Geography
The Montluçon - Guéret Airport is entirely within the commune's borders.

Population

Sights
 The church, dating from the thirteenth century.
 The remains of a fifteenth-century castle.

See also
Communes of the Creuse department

References

Communes of Creuse